Super Rugby Aotearoa named the Sky Super Rugby Aotearoa for sponsorship purposes was a professional men's rugby union national club competition in New Zealand. Originally created to supplement the 2020 Super Rugby season, which was suspended due to the COVID-19 pandemic, the tournament continued in 2021, with a competition being confirmed later that year, that will include 12 teams in a brand new competition named Super Rugby Pacific.

In its first season, the tournament was a 10-week round robin tournament played between the five New Zealand-based teams of Super Rugby However, for 2021, the tournament had an additional final between the two highest placed teams in the tournament, with a finals system being used by the similarly created Super Rugby AU tournament in Australia.

Law adaptions 
On 2 June, New Zealand Rugby announced that it would implement two optional law trials being offered by World Rugby, including a golden point format for extra time, and that players who receive a red card can be substituted after 20 minutes. It was also stated that referees would be stricter in applying laws for breakdowns to increase the pace of play.

Broadcasters 

Super Rugby Aotearoa is shown by the following broadcasters:

Corporate relations

Sponsorship
The 2020 tournament was run by Rugby New Zealand with the sponsorship of Foxtel which provided television coverage on its Fox Sports channels with Sky (New Zealand) being the naming rights sponsor. Gilbert is the official supplier of all rugby balls.

Merchandising
Official match day attire together with other club merchandise is sold through the 
Super Rugby Aotearoa's stores and website as well through the clubs and through some retailers.

See also

SANZAAR
Super Rugby
Super Rugby AU
Super Rugby Unlocked

References

External links
 

 
 
 
Rugby union competitions for provincial teams
Fox Sports (Australian TV network)
Recurring sporting events established in 2020
2020 establishments in New Zealand
Sports leagues established in 2020
Professional sports leagues in New Zealand